The 2012–13 Omani Federation Cup was the second edition of a pre-season football competition held in Oman. The first edition was played in 2007. The competition started on 2 August 2012 and finished on 28 January 2013.

The competition featured four groups of 3 teams, with the top two advancing to the quarter-final stages.

The competition featured all the clubs playing in the top flight in the 2012–13 season. Two clubs, Oman Club and Al-Seeb Club who won the first edition withdrew due to a dispute with the Oman Football Association.

Group stage

Group A

Group B

Group C

Group D

Quarter finals

Semi finals

Final

External links
Oman Federation Cup 2012 at futbol24.com
Omani Federation Cup 2012 at Goalzz.com

Oman Professional League Cup
2012–13 in Omani football